Jürg Studer (born 8 September 1966) is a Swiss former professional footballer who played as a midfielder.

He earned six caps for the Swiss national team and was in the Swiss squad at the 1994 FIFA World Cup.

References

External links
 

1966 births
Living people
Association football midfielders
Swiss men's footballers
1994 FIFA World Cup players
Switzerland international footballers
Swiss Super League players
FC Zürich players
FC Lausanne-Sport players
BSC Young Boys players
FC Aarau players
Swiss-German people